Elías Patricio Alderete (born 30 July 1995) is an Argentine professional footballer who plays as a forward for Primera Nacional club Chacarita Juniors.

Career
Alderete started his career in 2014 with Chacarita Juniors of Primera B Metropolitana. He played three times during 2013–14, including his professional debut on 16 April in a 1–0 win over Colegiales. Just seven more appearances followed in the next three seasons in Primera B Metropolitana and Primera B Nacional, but he did play twenty-eight times during the 2016–17 Primera B Nacional season which ended with promotion to the top-flight of Argentine football. He also scored five goals during 2016–17, with his career first coming against Flandria in December 2016.

In January 2020, Alderete was loaned by Chacarita to Indonesian Liga 1 side Arema for one year. He scored a penalty on debut in March during a defeat to Persib Bandung.

Career statistics

References

External links

1995 births
Living people
Argentine footballers
Sportspeople from Buenos Aires Province
Association football forwards
Argentine expatriate footballers
Expatriate footballers in Indonesia
Argentine expatriate sportspeople in Indonesia
Expatriate footballers in Bolivia
Argentine expatriate sportspeople in Bolivia
Primera B Metropolitana players
Primera Nacional players
Argentine Primera División players
Liga 1 (Indonesia) players
Bolivian Primera División players
Chacarita Juniors footballers
Arema F.C. players
Club Aurora players
Estudiantes de Buenos Aires footballers